Mayobridge is a village within Newry, County Down, Northern Ireland, lying on the small river Clanrye which divides the townlands of Mayo and Bavan. It is located within the Newry and Mourne District Council area - it had a population of 1,069 people in the 2011 Census.  It falls within the parish of Clonallan, and historically within the barony of Upper Iveagh Upper.

Demography 
Mayobridge is classified as a small village or hamlet by the NI Statistics and Research Agency (NISRA). It had a usually resident population of 1,069 according to the 2011 census.

Facilities 

On 15 August 1859, Dr. Leahy, the co-adjutor bishop of the diocese, blessed the foundation stone of a new Catholic church to replace the existing, more primitive Mass House put up in 1806 (parts of which are still visible in the disused Parochial Hall); and a curate was appointed to live in Mayobridge. The new church, dedicated to St. Patrick, was erected on the site of a former Mass Rock. A fine Gothic-style building, reputed to be the largest ‘country' church in the diocese, it could hold up to 600 worshippers in comfort, and commanded a fine view of the surrounding countryside right into County Armagh.  It was completed on 12 October 1862, with a dedicatory sermon by the Bishop of Kerry, Dr. David Moriarty.

A police barracks was moved in 1854 from the Mayo side of  the village to the Bavan side, and returned in 1865.

The local primary school, St. Patrick's Primary School, is located on Chapel Hill.

Sport 
Mayobridge St. Patrick's is the oldest Gaelic Athletic Association club in County Down.
The minutes of the Central Council of the GAA record that on April 30, 1888 an application for affiliation was received from St Patrick's, Mayobridge. The acceptance of the application makes it the oldest registered GAA club in the county. Mayobridge won their tenth Down Senior Football Championship (and their fifth consecutive championship) in 2008. Mayobridge's reserve (seconds) team also won the Down Premier Reserve Football Championship and their minor team won the Down Minor Football Championship in 2008.

Notable people 
Kieran Goss (b. 1962) contemporary singer, songwriter
Tommy Sands (b. 1945) folk singer, songwriter and radio broadcaster
Mickey Linden, Gaelic footballer, winner of All-Ireland Senior Football Championship in 1991 and 1994
Tom O'Hare (b. 1942) Gaelic footballer, winner of All-Ireland Senior Football Championship in 1968

See also 
List of villages in Northern Ireland

References 

Villages in County Down